XYZnetworks was an Australian media company that owned, operated and distributed eleven subscription television channels in Australia. XYZnetworks was jointly owned by Foxtel and Austar. Based in Sydney, they had roughly 170 employees, with offices in North Ryde.

Some of the channels owned by XYZnetworks included:
 Arena
 Channel [V] 
 Country Music Channel
 MAX
 The LifeStyle Channel and LifeStyle HD (a high definition simulcast)
 LifeStyle Food
 LifeStyle Home
 LifeStyle You
 The Weather Channel Australia
 [V] Hits (formerly Channel [V]2 and Club [V]).

XYZnetworks also distributed Discovery Channel and jointly owned Nickelodeon and Nick Jr. XYZ operated Arena until 1 October 2007, when it became a channel wholly operated by parent company Foxtel, with XYZ still owning the channel.

On 24 May 2012, Foxtel and Austar merged resulting in Foxtel wholly owning XYZ Networks, resulting in Foxtel closing XYZ and moving all channels to Foxtel Networks.

References

External links
 Official website

Television broadcasting companies of Australia
Mass media companies disestablished in 2012
Defunct broadcasting companies of Australia